Companhia do Metropolitano de São Paulo (CMSP) is a Brazilian mixed economy company, based in São Paulo, which most of its investments belong to the Government of the State of São Paulo. Founded by the Prefecture of São Paulo on 24 April 1968, the company is responsible for the development, project, construction and operation of the metropolitan transport system in the Greater São Paulo, specially the capital metro. Having most of its share control associated to the state government, it's subordinated to the Secretariat of Metropolitan Transports of the State of São Paulo.

The company is member of the National Association of Passenger Carriers on Rails (ANPTrilhos).

Evolution of the share control

See also
 ViaQuatro
 ViaMobilidade

References

External links
 

Companies based in São Paulo
São Paulo Metro
Railway companies of Brazil
Railway companies established in 1968